Ileden and Oxenden Woods is an  biological Site of Special Scientific Interest (SSSI) south-east of Canterbury in Kent. It is in the Kent Downs Area of Outstanding Natural Beauty and is located in Adisham parish.

The SSSI incorporates six named woods. From north to south, these are Oxenden Wood, Pitt Wood, Woodlands Wood, Boughtonland Wood, Well Wood and Ileden Wood.

These woods have a variety of soil types and diverse habitats. There is a rich bird community and ground flora, including two nationally rare orchids, narrow-lipped helleborine and lady orchid.

Public footpaths go through the woods.

Controversy 
Ileden and Oxenden Woods has been the subject of significant local dispute in recent years over public access, ownership and management.

In 2010, Adisham residents protested when local landowner and former banker to the Queen, Timothy Steel, attempted to prevent walkers from accessing paths in the woods. After Kent County Council's order to maintain public access was appealed by Mr. Steel, a public enquiry followed, which ruled in the villagers’ favour and confirmed the status of the paths as public rights of way.

In 2019, concerns were raised by local residents regarding the ownership and management of the woodland, after Woodlands.co.uk acquired land in Pitt and Oxenden Woods. A public meeting was held in September 2019, where the possible impact of Woodlands.co.uk's practices of woodland lotting – the selling of woodland in small chunks – was discussed, and a recommendation was made to retain management of the woodland as a whole. The company had also submitted plans to widen and resurface the woodland paths with aggregate, however these plans were later abandoned.

In 2021, Oxenden and Pitt Wood were sold without being subdivided. A local group of volunteers, Watch Over Adisham's Woods, has since been working with the new owners of all woods in the Ileden and Oxenden SSSI, discussing management plans, sharing information about flora and fauna and collectively resolving issues that arise.

References

Sites of Special Scientific Interest in Kent
Forests and woodlands of Kent